General John Leslie, 10th Earl of Rothes KT (169810 December 1767) was a senior British Army officer who became Commander-in-Chief of the Royal Irish Army between 1758 and 1767.

Military career
Born the eldest son of John Hamilton-Leslie, 9th Earl of Rothes and Lady Jean Hay, daughter of John Hay, 2nd Marquess of Tweeddale, Leslie was commissioned into the 9th Regiment of Dragoons in 1715. In 1717 he transferred to the 3rd Regiment of Foot Guards.

He became Commanding Officer of the 21st Regiment of Foot in 1721 and inherited his father's title the following year. He became a Scottish representative peer in 1723. In 1732 he took over command of the 25th Regiment of Foot. He fought at the Battle of Dettingen in 1743 and, having transferred to the Horse Grenadier Guards, at the Battle of Rocoux in 1744. In 1751 he transferred to the military staff in Ireland and in 1758 he became Commander-in-Chief, Ireland. His home, Leslie House in the village of Leslie, was seriously damaged by fire in 1763. He died at his home in 1767.

In 1747, under the Heritable Jurisdictions Act, he sold the office of Sheriff of Fife, which had been a hereditary right of the earldom since 1540.

Family
In 1741 he married Hannah Howard, daughter of Matthew Cole of Thorpe, Norfolk and his wife Brittania Cole; they went on to have two sons and two daughters, including John Leslie, 11th Earl of Rothes and Jane Elizabeth Leslie, 12th Countess of Rothes, who succeeded to her brother's title, defeating the rival claim of her uncle Andrew. Mary, the youngest daughter, married William Colyear, 3rd Earl of Portmore.

In 1763, following the death of his first wife, he married Mary Lloyd, daughter of Gresham Lloyd and Mary Holt, who after Lloyd's death remarried Thomas Hamilton, 7th Earl of Haddington, a close relative of Rothes.

References

1698 births
1767 deaths
6th (Inniskilling) Dragoons officers
King's Own Scottish Borderers officers
Knights of the Thistle
British Army generals
British Life Guards officers
Royal Scots Greys officers
Scottish representative peers
Commanders-in-Chief, Ireland
Members of the Privy Council of Ireland
10